The 2006 Torneo Godó was a men's professional tennis tournament that was part of the International Series Gold of the 2006 ATP Tour. It was the 54th edition of the Torneo Godó and it took place from 24 April until 30 April 2006 in Barcelona, Catalonia, Spain. First-seeded Rafael Nadal won the singles title.

Finals

Singles

 Rafael Nadal defeated  Tommy Robredo, 6–4, 6–4, 6–0

Doubles

 Mark Knowles /  Daniel Nestor defeated  Mariusz Fyrstenberg /  Marcin Matkowski, 6–2, 6–7(4–7), [10–5]

External links
ITF tournament details

 
2006
Torneo Godo
Tennis
Godo